Godfrey Gummer Goodwin (January 11, 1873 – February 16, 1933) was a Representative from Minnesota.

Early life
He was born Alfred Gustafson near St. Peter, Nicollet County, Minnesota, to a single mother, Cecilia Carlson (née Sissa Carlsdotter), a native of Sweden. They moved to St. Paul, Minnesota, in 1882, where he took the name Godfrey Gummer Goodwin. He attended public schools and graduated from the faculty of law at the University of Minnesota at Minneapolis in 1896. He was admitted to the bar in 1896 and commenced practice in Cambridge, Minnesota.

He married Geneva Edwina Josephina Gouldberg June 5, 1905. He served as president of the Board of Education in Cambridge, Minnesota from 1914 to 1917.

Political career
He was prosecuting attorney of Isanti County from 1898 to 1907. He was elected to the position again in November 1913, and served until February 15, 1925, when he resigned as he had been elected to Congress.

He was elected as a Republican to the 69th, 70th, 71st, and 72nd congresses, serving from March 4, 1925, to February 16, 1933. After his congressional district was eliminated, he failed to receive nomination to the at-large Minnesota delegation in 1932. He plunged to his death from a window of the Hotel Driscoll in Washington, D.C., on February 16, 1933, only two weeks before the end of his final term. It is not known whether Goodwin intended to commit suicide or if the fall was an accident. He is interred in Lakewood Cemetery, Minneapolis, Minnesota.

See also
 List of United States Congress members who died in office (1900–49)

References

External links
 .

1873 births
1933 deaths
American people of Swedish descent
American prosecutors
Minnesota lawyers
People from Cambridge, Minnesota
People from St. Peter, Minnesota
University of Minnesota Law School alumni
Deaths from falls
Republican Party members of the United States House of Representatives from Minnesota
School board members in Minnesota